Dermatitis repens (also known as Acrodermatitis continua, Acrodermatitis perstans, Pustular acrodermatitis, Acrodermatitis continua of Hallopeau, Acrodermatitis continua suppurativa Hallopeau, Hallopeau's acrodermatitis,  Hallopeau's acrodermatitis continua, and Dermatitis repens Crocker) is a rare, sterile, pustular eruption of the fingers and toes that slowly extends proximally.

See also 
 List of cutaneous conditions
 François Henri Hallopeau
 Psoriasis
 Skin lesion

References 

Recalcitrant palmoplantar eruptions